Woodland Regional High School is a high school located in the western part of Beacon Falls, Connecticut, near the town line shared with Oxford.

The school is operated by Regional School District 16. The school mascot is Harry the hawk. Students residing in the towns of Beacon Falls and Prospect in grades 9 through 12 attend the school.

Footnotes

External links
 

Beacon Falls, Connecticut
Prospect, Connecticut
Schools in New Haven County, Connecticut
Public high schools in Connecticut